Ministerialists and Oppositionists (Western Australia) were political groupings that were in force in the Western Australian parliament between 1890 and 1911.

At the establishment of the WA parliament in 1890, Ministerialists were defined as those who supported the government of the day (led by John Forrest), while Oppositionists were opposed to it. Multiple candidates for each grouping could run for a given seat. The Australian Labour Party (ALP) was the only major grouping outside this structure. Additionally, some candidates ran as an "Independent". 

At the 1901 WA election, the Ministerialists (aligned with Forrest) lost to the Oppositionists (led by George Leake). However, the labels stuck to the groupings, and the "Oppositionists" now had power and the ministries. This strange use of nomenclature ceased with the defeat of the Oppositionists by the Ministerialists at the 1904 election. Around this point, the term "Oppositionist" ceased to be used. The Ministerialists were then to retain power until their defeat by the ALP at the 1911 election. 

Immediately after this, the Ministerialist grouping became the centre-right Western Australian Liberal Party (1911–17) under the continued guidance of John Forrest.

In the 1920s, the centre-right Nationalist party (heirs to the Liberal Party) retained the practice of allowing multiple party candidates to compete against each other in a single member seat.

Despite the centre-right parties being in opposition at the time, the Ministerialist term was still used to describe them in WA politics in the 1920s and in the 1940s. The term had long ceased to have any connection to the holding of ministries.

Opposition
The Opposition was a political grouping in Western Australia in the late 19th and early 20th centuries. In the Western Australian Parliament, there were initially no official parties, government being carried out by a loose coalition of members with similar interests. The pre-federation Legislative Assembly (1890–1901) had only one premier, John Forrest.  Those members who supported him were generally referred to as the Pro-Forrest group whilst the majority of others were referred to as the Opposition.

For some years following federation, this continued, even though, at times the non Pro-Forrest group were in government, thus having the anomalous situation where the Opposition (Party) was in fact the Government.

As well as the Pro-Forrest and the Opposition members there were a small number (initially) who supported the emerging Labor Party as well as a few who considered themselves to be non aligned to any grouping, collectively referred to as Independents.

In the early post federation years, government in Western Australia was quite unstable in that all governments until 1906 were minority governments, relying on the support of sufficient independents, (along with a few that from time to time were persuaded to change "sides") to form an effective government.  Thus it was in the immediate post-federation period 1901 - 1906, Western Australia had seven changes of government and Premier.

It was not until the Ministerial Party (a carry over from the Pro-Forrest group) led by Sir Newton Moore won the 1906 election that a Party was able to govern in its own right and complete a full term of office.

Elsewhere
The "Ministerialist"/"Oppositionalist" means of defining political parties was for a long time in use in the United Kingdom.

The terminology was also used in Queensland until its 1907 election.

Relevant elections
 1890 Western Australian colonial election
 1894 Western Australian colonial election
 1897 Western Australian colonial election
 1901 Western Australian state election
 1904 Western Australian state election
 1905 Western Australian state election
 1908 Western Australian state election
 1911 Western Australian state election

Notes

Defunct political parties in Western Australia
Political parties established in 1890
Political parties disestablished in 1911